The Liberal Catholic Church, Province of the United States of America is a province of the Liberal Catholic Church, a Liberal Catholic denomination.

Background 
The United States became a Province in 1919. The Liberal Catholic Church, Province of the United States of America was incorporated in Maryland on April 16, 1962.

References

External links
 The Liberal Catholic Church official website
 The Liberal Catholic Church - Province of the United States of America official website
 The Liberal Catholic Church - Province of Australia official website

Christian organizations established in 1919
1919 establishments in the United States
Liberal Catholicism